The Dewoitine D.27 was a parasol monoplane fighter aircraft designed by Émile Dewoitine in 1928.

Design and development
After the end of World War I, the slump in demand for aircraft forced Dewoitine to close his company and move to Switzerland in 1927.

He produced the D.27 the following year, 66 of which were produced for the Swiss Air Force from 1931. It was also license-built in Yugoslavia by Zmaj aircraft and in Romania.

Operational history
Seven strengthened versions, designated the D.53, served experimentally with the French Escadrille 7C1, flying from the aircraft carrier .

Variants
 D.271 :  One aircraft used for testing a Hispano-Suiza 12Hb engine. 
 D.273 :  One aircraft used for testing a Bristol Jupiter engine with supercharger. 
 D.531 : One aircraft used for testing a Hispano-Suiza engine.
 D.532 : A single aircraft used for testing a Rolls-Royce Kestrel inline engine.
 D.535 : One aircraft fitted with an HS 12Xbis engine.
 D.534 : Used for parachute trials.

Operators

Aviation Navale

Royal Romanian Air Force

Spanish Republican Air Force

Swiss Air Force

Royal Yugoslav Air Force

Specifications (D.27)

See also

References

Bibliography

External links

 Virtual Aviation Museum

1920s French fighter aircraft
D.027
Parasol-wing aircraft
Single-engined tractor aircraft
Aircraft first flown in 1928